Domeabra-Obom  is one of the constituencies represented in the Parliament of Ghana. It elects one Member of Parliament (MP) by the first past the post system of election. Domeabra-Obom is located in the Ga South Municipal  of the Greater Accra Region of Ghana.

Boundaries
The seat is located within the Accra Metropolis District of the Greater Accra Region of Ghana. It was formed prior to the 2004 December presidential and parliamentary elections by the division of the old Ga South constituency into the new Domeabra-Obom, Weija and the Trobu-Amasaman constituencies.

Members of Parliament

Elections

See also
List of Ghana Parliament constituencies

References 

Parliamentary constituencies in the Greater Accra Region